= Reynolds View =

- Location within Gauteng Location within South Africa
- Coordinates: 26.201°S 28.078°E
- Country: South Africa
- Province: Gauteng
- Municipality: City of Johannesburg
- Established: 1930
- Time zone: UTC+2 (SAST)
- Postal code (street): 2094

Reynolds View is a suburb of Johannesburg, South Africa. It is located in Region F of the City of Johannesburg Metropolitan Municipality.

The suburb is a small enclave on the western edge of Kensington where it meets Malvern at the Jeppe High Preparatory School. Reynold's Street runs east to west along a small ridge overlooking Malvern to the south. Entrance into the suburb is from the north, either turning south from Roberts Avenue into Dorris Street or west into Vulcan Street from MacDonald Street and then south into Dorris.

== History ==
Named after Alice Ethel Reynolds, who in 1924 asked for the Western Reserves Malvern to be proclaimed as a suburb and was done so in 1930.

Oral history of the suburb holds that it was formerly a quarry. This is supported by drill marks for blasting charges in the rock on the northern side of Reynold's Street.
